Papua New Guinea is a tier three rugby union playing nation. They began playing international rugby union in 1965 and have yet to make the Rugby World Cup. Teams from Papua New Guinea have competed in the Commonwealth games.

Although Papua New Guinea has a rugby union tradition, rugby league is far more popular and is the national sport. Despite this, there are 8520 registered players of rugby union and 57 clubs.

The national side is ranked 83rd in the world (as of 27 June 2022).

Governing body
The governing body is the Papua New Guinea Rugby Football Union.

History
Rugby is long established in PNG, and tends to fall under the Australian sphere of influence. The game has been played as a folk sport in many regions, and the country's general lack of infrastructure has hindered its national development.

Due to its close relationship with Queensland in Australia, rugby league is very strong in the country.

Former Grand Slam Wallaby Brendan Moon lives on the island, and has been helping the development for a number of years.

As with many of the Pacific Nations, PNG has tended to do best at rugby sevens, and has a strong national sevens team.

National team
The Papua New Guinea national rugby union team is nicknamed the "Puk-Puks", from the Tok Pisin word for "crocodiles". They have not qualified for a Rugby World Cup yet.

See also

Papua New Guinea national rugby sevens team
Papua New Guinea national under-20 rugby union team
Papua New Guinea Rugby Football Union
Sport in Papua New Guinea

External links
 IRB PNG page
 Federation of Oceania Rugby Unions, Vanuatu page
 Oceania nations, Papua New Guine
 Two days of rugby union sevens

References

 Cotton, Fran (Ed.) (1984) The Book of Rugby Disasters & Bizarre Records. Compiled by Chris Rhys. London. Century Publishing.